Darbellay is a surname. Notable people with the surname include:

Christophe Darbellay (born 1971), Swiss politician
Joseph E. Darbellay (1845–1900), American merchant and politician
Jean-Luc Darbellay (born 1946), Swiss composer, conductor, clarinetist and physician

See also 
 Darbellay, Wisconsin (today's name Bay View), is an unincorporated community in the town of Red River, Wisconsin, Kewaunee County, Wisconsin, United States